Pedro Julio Montas Hernández (born April 4, 1959) is a Dominican former professional baseball player.

Hernández was born in La Romana, Dominican Republic, and attended of Xaverian High School in Brooklyn, New York.

He also played for 12 minor league teams in 1977–1982 and 1984–85.

References

External links

1959 births
Living people
Daytona Beach Astros players
Dominican Republic expatriate baseball players in Canada
Dominican Republic expatriate baseball players in the United States

Major League Baseball players from the Dominican Republic
Major League Baseball third basemen
Syracuse Chiefs players
Toronto Blue Jays players
Truchas de Toluca players
Xaverian High School alumni
People from La Romana, Dominican Republic
Dominican Republic expatriate baseball players in Mexico
Dominican Republic emigrants to the United States
Columbus Astros players
Columbus Clippers players
Gulf Coast Astros players
Kinston Eagles players
Knoxville Blue Jays players
Tucson Toros players